Love Conquers All is the second album by Los Angeles, California soul singer Michael Wycoff, produced by Webster Lewis.

Track listing

Personnel 
 Michael Wycoff – lead and backing vocals, keyboards
 Webster Lewis – keyboards
 Al McKay, David T. Walker, Charles Bynum – guitar
 Nathan Watts, Eddie N. Watkins Jr. – bass
 James Gadson – drums
 Fred Wesley, George Bohanon – trombone
 Ray Brown, John Roberts, Nolan Smith – trumpet
 Ronald Brown, Jeff Clayton, Ernie Fields – woodwind
 Bob Watts – French horn
 Janice Gower – concertmaster
 New Paradise – backing vocals
 H.B. Barnum, Webster Lewis – string arrangements
 Ernie Fields, James Gadson, Webster Lewis – horn arrangements
 James Gadson, Michael Wycoff, Monica Pege, Webster Lewis – vocal arrangements
Technical
Bob Hughes, Kirk Butler, Steve Macmillan - engineer
Scott Hensel - photography

Charts

References

External links 
 Michael Wycoff – Love Conquers All at Discogs

1982 albums
Albums arranged by H. B. Barnum
RCA Records albums